Trần Hữu Tri (1915—1951), commonly known by his pseudonym Nam Cao, was a Vietnamese short story writer and novelist. His works generally received high acclaim from critics for their thoughtful description and veracious reflection of the society in the 1945 era. As a member of the Cultural Association for National Liberation led by the Communist Party, he was frequently sent to various places to do missions. In November 1951, he was ambushed and killed on the way to Lien Khu III, Ninh Bình Province, before his intention of writing a novel about his country and the revolution was ever met.

Biography
Nam Cao was born on October 29, 1915, to a poor farming family in Lý Nhân District, Hà Nam Province. He was the only child in the family who received a full education. After finishing high school, he headed to Saigon working as a clerk in a tailor’s;  his first works were written during this time. Not long after that, he worked as a teacher at Công Thành, a private school in Hanoi, to earn his living while cultivating knowledge and experience to nourish his writing career. However, as Japan sent military troops to the area, the school was soon closed to be used as a rice barn for Japanese soldiers, resulting in his unemployment. He lived an arduous life, making both ends meet by home tutoring and writing for some newspapers until 1943 when he became a member of Hội văn hóa cứu quốc (The Cultural Association for National Salvation), a position that made him become the target of constant persecution. Aware of the danger, he came back to his hometown and joined the armed forces to overthrow the then administration. During that time, he was elected the first president of Lý Nhân District. However, he left the post after a few months and was dispatched to several areas around the country from 1946 to 1951, then working as an editor for Cứu quốc (National Salvation) and Văn nghệ (Literature & Arts) newspapers in Việt Bắc . Many of his works were written during this time, notably including Đôi mắt (The Eyes) (1950), the diary Ở rừng (Living in the Forest) (1948) and the memoir Chuyện biên giới (Story in the Frontier) (1948) which won extensive praise. He died on November 30, 1951, in a mission in Ninh Bình Province at age 36.

He had five children, one of them died in the Vietnamese Famine of 1945.

Writing career
Nam Cao is often referred to as one of the most prominent short-story writers in Vietnamese literature. In fact, his works became widely known only after the birth of the short story “Chí Phèo” in 1941, which reaches the zenith of success in his writing career. 
 
Prior to the August Revolution, his works often focused on two main themes: the life of the impoverished lower middle-class intellects and the destitute life of the farmers in rural areas during the war. Through these stories he successfully depicted the plight of miserable people in the society with unfeigned vivid words and flexible descriptions. He specifically concentrated on the lingering distressful tragedies of their inner souls, indirectly brought forward the prevailing  social problems of his period.

Works

Stage plays
 Contribution  (Đóng góp) (1951)

Novels
 A neighbor’s story (1944)
 Living a corroded life (Sống mòn) (1944 - published in 1956)
 Other four lost manuscripts: The bowl, A person’s life, The temple, A flooded day.

Short stories

Ba người bạn (Three friends)
Bài học quét nhà (A lesson in sweeping)
Bẩy bông lúa lép (Seven flat rice ears)
Cái chết của con Mực (The death of the black dog)
Cái mặt không chơi được (An unfriendly face)
Chuyện buồn giữa đêm vui (The sad story in the happy night)
Cười (Laughing)
Con mèo (The cat)
Con mèo mắt ngọc (The opal-eyed cat)
Chí Phèo (1941)
Đầu đường xó chợ (The street urchin)
Điếu văn (A funeral oration)
Đôi mắt (The eyes) (1948)
Đôi móng giò (A pair of pig-trotters)
Đời thừa (A redundant life) (1943)
Đòn chồng
Đón khách (Greeting guests)
Nhỏ nhen (Narrow-mindedness)
Làm tổ (Making a nest)
Lang Rận (Doctor Lice)
Lão Hạc (Old Man Hạc) (1943)
Mong mưa (Longing for Rain)
Một chuyện xu-vơ-nia (A souvenir story)
Một đám cưới (A wedding) (1944)
Mua danh (Bribery)
Mua nhà (Buying a house)
Người thợ rèn (The blacksmith)
Nhìn người ta sung sướng (Seeing them happy)
Những chuyện không muốn viết (Stories unwilling to write)
Những trẻ khốn nạn (The cursed youths)
Nụ cười (The smile)
Nước mắt (Tears)
Nửa đêm (Midnight)
Phiêu lưu (An adventure)
Quái dị (Abnormality)
Quên điều độ (Irregularity)
Rình trộm (Eavesdropping)
Rửa hờn (Retaliating for the Indignant)
Sao lại thế này? (Why?)
Thôi về đi (Let's just go home)
Trăng sáng (A bright moon) (1942)
Trẻ con không được ăn thịt chó (Kids shouldn't eat dog meat)
Chuyện biên giới (Story in the Frontier)
Chuyện tình (Love story)
Tư cách mõ (The doorman's personality)
Từ ngày mẹ chết (Since my mother died)
Xem bói (Fortune-telling)

External links

Nam Cao's biography 
Short biography and notable works  (archive)

1915 births
1951 deaths
Vietnamese male short story writers
Vietnamese short story writers
Vietnamese journalists
20th-century journalists
20th-century pseudonymous writers